Pinalia amica is a species of orchid.

References

amica